Alain Demurger is a modern French historian, and a leading specialist of the history of the Knights Templar and the Crusades.

Alain Demurger is honorary maître de conférences at the Université de Paris I Panthéon-Sorbonne. He specializes in the history of the Crusades, the history of the religious orders, and the state of France at the end of the Middle Ages.

Demurger has been praised as the author of a good general survey on the Knights Templar, in Malcolm Barber's book The New Knighthood (p. 397): "There are good general surveys, by Marie-Louise Bulst-Theile, Sacrae Domus Militiae Templi Hierosolymitani Magistri (1974), and Alain Demurger, Vie et mort de l'ordre du Temple" (Life and Death of the Order of the Temple) (1985).

Publications

Military orders
 Chevaliers du Christ, les ordres religieux militaires au Moyen Âge, Le Seuil, 2002, 416 pages.

Knights Templar
 Vie et mort de l'ordre du Temple, 1120-1314, Edition Nathan, Paris, 1998, 448 pages.
 Jacques de Molay : le crépuscule des templiers, Biographie Payot, Paris, 2002, 396 pages.
 Les Templiers. Une chevalerie chrétienne au Moyen Âge, Le Seuil, 2005, 
 Les Templiers, Editions Jean-Paul Gisserot, 2007,

Crusades
 La croisade au Moyen Âge. Idée et pratiques, Paris, F. Nathan, (Coll. 128), 1998.
 Brève histoire des Ordres religieux-militaires [Guide aide-mémoire], Gavaudun, Ed. Fragile. 1997.
 Croisades et croisés au Moyen Âge, Champs Flammarion, Paris 2006,

Middle ages
 Nouvelles histoires de la France médiévale. Tome 5 : Temps de crises. Temps d'espoirs. Points Seuil, Paris, 1990.
 L'Occident médiéval : XIII-XV siècle, Hachette Education, collection « Les fondamentaux - histoire géographie », 2004.

Articles
 « La Famille Jouvenel. Quelques questions sur un tableau », Annuaire-Bulletin de la Société de l’Histoire de France, 1997, p. 39-56.
 « Trésor des Templiers, trésor du roi. Mise au point sur les opérations financières des templiers », dans Pouvoir et Gestion, Toulouse, Presses de l'Université des Sciences sociales, 1997, p. 73-86.
 « Le religieux de Saint-Denis et la croisade », dans Saint-Denis et la royauté. Mélanges offerts à Bernard Guenée, Actes du Colloque international en l'honneur de B. Guenée. Paris, Publications de la Sorbonne, 1999, pp. 181–196.
 « Les templiers à Auxerre », dans P. Boucheron et Jacques Chiffoleau, Religion et société urbaine au Moyen Age. Etudes offertes à Jean-Louis Biget, Paris, Publications de la Sorbonne, 2000, p. 301-312.
 « Pour trois mille livres de dette : Geoffroy de Sergines et le Temple », dans La présence latine en Orient au Moyen Âge, Paris, Centre historique des Archives Nationales, 2000, p. 67-76.
 Les Templiers : Guerriers du Pape

Video
Les Templiers partent en croisade, émission "C'est pas sorcier", France Télévision

Notes

References
Jacques de Molay. Le crépuscule des Templiers, Alain Demurger, Editions Payot & Rivage, 2002
The New Knighthood : A History of the Order of the Temple, Malcolm Barber
Le Point, "La Chute du Temple", May 27, 2008. Online article

Living people
Year of birth missing (living people)
20th-century French historians
Historians of the Crusades
French male non-fiction writers
Historians of the Knights Templar
21st-century French historians